Twenty Four Seven is a 1997 British sports drama film directed and written by Shane Meadows. It was co-written by frequent Meadows collaborator Paul Fraser.

Plot
In a typical English working-class town, the juveniles have nothing more to do than hang around in gangs. One day, Alan Darcy (Bob Hoskins), a highly motivated man with the same kind of youth experience, starts trying to get the young people off the street and into doing something they can believe in; boxing. Soon, he opens a training facility which is accepted gratefully by them and the gangs start to grow together into friends. Darcy manages to organise a public fight for them to prove what they have learned. A training camp with hiking tours into the mountains of Wales forge the group into a tightly knit club society. With the day of the fight drawing closer, the young boxers get more and more excited.

Cast
 Bob Hoskins as Alan Darcy 
 Danny Nussbaum as Tim 
 Justin Brady as Gadget 
 James Hooton as Wolfman Knighty 
 Darren O. Campbell as Daz 
 Karl Collins as Stuart 
 Johann Myers as Benny 
 Jimmy Hynd as Meggy 
 Mat Hand as Wesley Fagash
 James Corden as Tonka
 Frank Harper as Ronnie Marsh
 Bruce Jones as Tim's Dad
 Jo Bell as Jo

Reception
The film received very favourable press on release in the UK, including five star reviews from publications including Empire. It subsequently performed well at UK awards ceremonies. At the 1998 BAFTA Awards, it was nominated for the Alexander Korda Award for Best British Film. At the 1998 British Independent Film Awards, Meadows won the Douglas Hickox Award and the film was nominated in the Best British Independent Film category. Meadows won the FIPRESCI Prize at the 1997 Venice Film Festival.

External links

References

1990s sports drama films
1997 films
BBC Film films
British boxing films
British black-and-white films
British sports drama films
British teen drama films
Films directed by Shane Meadows
Films set in Nottingham
Films shot in Cheshire
Films shot in Derbyshire
Films shot in Nottinghamshire
Pathé films
Teen sports films
1997 drama films
1990s English-language films
1990s British films